The adjectival forms of the names of astronomical bodies are not always easily predictable. Attested adjectival forms of the larger bodies are listed below, along with the two small Martian moons; in some cases they are accompanied by their demonymic equivalents, which denote hypothetical inhabitants of these bodies.

For Classical (Greco-Roman) names, the adjectival and demonym forms normally derive from the oblique stem, which may differ from the nominative form used in English for the noun form. For instance, for a large portion of names ending in -s, the oblique stem and therefore the English adjective changes the -s to a -d, -t, or -r, as in Mars–Martian, Pallas–Palladian and Ceres–Cererian; 
occasionally an -n has been lost historically from the nominative form, and reappears in the oblique and therefor in the English adjective, as in Pluto–Plutonian and Atlas–Atlantean.

Many of the more recent or more obscure names are only attested in mythological or literary contexts, rather than in specifically astronomical contexts. Forms ending in -ish or -ine, such as "Puckish", are not included below if a derivation in -an is also attested. Rare forms, or forms only attested with spellings not in keeping with the IAU-approved spelling (such as c for k), are shown in italics.

Note on pronunciation
The suffix -ian is always unstressed: that is, . The related ending -ean, from an e in the root plus a suffix -an, has traditionally been stressed (that is) if the e is long ē in Latin (or is from  ē in Greek); but if the e is short in Latin, the suffix is pronounced the same as -ian. In practice forms ending in -ean may be pronounced as if they were spelled -ian even if the e is long in Latin.

Generic bodies

Constellations
Derivative forms of constellations are used primarily for meteor showers. The genitive forms of the constellations are used to name stars. (See List of constellations.) Other adjectival forms are less common.

Sun

Planets

Moons

Galaxies

See also
Demonym

Notes

References

External links
Wordorigins.org: Naming The Planets, Part I

Astronomical nomenclature
Lists of astronomical objects
Lists of place names